Humbertus Guilielmus de Precipiano (12 September 1627 in Rougemont, France – 9 June 1711 in Mechelen) was Archbishop of Mechelen (now in Belgium).

Life
He was the son of Achilles de Precipiano, Baron of Soye and anna de Montrichard. He received the tonsure in 1641, and received the Prebendary as noble canon in Besançon Cathedral.

Career 
In 1660 he was elected abbot of Bellevaux abbey for the period of 1660–1682. During this period he was elected archdeacon of the royal Besançon chapter. In favor of a high career his ordinations followed quickly. In 1673 Mgr D' Allamont of Ghent died in Madrid and he hoped to receive from the Spanish court the wealthy diocese of Ghent. However the Regentes did refuse. In 1683 he was named bishop of Bruges and was ordained by Alphonse de Berghes.

He was appointed Archbishop on 12 July 1689, after royal approbation. He had previously been the chief councillor for the Netherlands and Burgundy for the Habsburg monarchy.

During his episcopate he did fight against the Jansenism priest and clergy. He died in Mechelen after pneumonia.

References

1627 births
1711 deaths
17th-century Roman Catholic archbishops in the Holy Roman Empire
18th-century Roman Catholic archbishops in the Holy Roman Empire
Roman Catholic archbishops of Mechelen-Brussels
Clergy from Besançon